Wijkanderberget is a mountain in Wedel Jarlsberg Land at Spitsbergen, Svalbard. 

It is named after Swedish physicist and astronomer August Wijkander, who joined Nordenskiöld's expedition of 1872. The mountain has two peaks of equal height, 562 m.a.s.l. and is situated between Scottbreen, Blomlibreen and Blomlidalen.

References

Mountains of Spitsbergen